Kimberley Junior School is part of a family of schools, with Kimberley Boys' High School and Kimberley Girls' High School, tracing their ultimate origins to the Kimberley Public Undenominational Schools founded in 1887. Kimberley Junior School came into existence in its present form with the amalgamation of Belgravia Junior School and Kimberley Boys' Junior School in January 1977, in buildings built for, and occupied for just over half a decade by, Kimberley Boys' Junior School, itself having hived off from Kimberley Boys' High in July 1970.

Kimberley Boys' Junior School
Founded in 1970 when the junior section of "KHS" (Kimberley Boys' High School) moved, in July of that year, to a new school building in Monument Heights.

Belgravia Junior School
Belgravia Preparatory School was established in Elsmere Road in 1907 - its building forming the nucleus of the subsequent Girls' High School that moved to the site in 1913. Belgravia Junior School later occupied a building designed by William Timlin at the bottom of Memorial Road, on the site of the former St Michael's School. It was from here that Belgravia moved to the new Kimberley Junior School in 1977.

References

Schools in the Northern Cape
Kimberley, Northern Cape